Alexander Leslie-Melville, Viscount Balgonie (19. November 1831 – 29. August 1857) was a British soldier.

He held the title of Lord Balgonie as a courtesy title; he was the eldest son of David-Leslie Melville, 8th Earl of Leven, 7th Earl of Melville. He served in the Grenadier Guards, and died in 1857 as a result of hard campaigning in the Crimean War.

References
The Great Historic Families of Scotland: the Leslies of Leven (1887) by James Taylor

1857 deaths
Grenadier Guards officers
British Army personnel of the Crimean War
1831 births
Heirs apparent who never acceded
Balgonie
British military personnel killed in the Crimean War